Abdoulie Bah (born 5 November 1997) is a Gambian footballer who plays as a midfielder for Real de Banjul FC.

References

1997 births
Living people
Gambian footballers
Association football midfielders
Gambia Ports Authority FC players
Real de Banjul FC players
The Gambia international footballers